Majagual is a town and municipality located in the Sucre Department, northern Colombia.

Climate
Majagual has a tropical monsoon climate (Am) with

References

 Gobernacion de Sucre - Majagual

Sucre